ウツセミ (Utsusemi) is the eighth full-length album by the Japanese rock group Plastic Tree. The limited edition album was sold with two bonus tracks and a poster.

Track listing

External links

Plastic Tree albums
2008 albums